Theophilus Feild or Field (bap. 1575, Cripplegate – 1636) was successively bishop of Llandaff (1619-1627), of St. David's (1627-1635) and of Hereford (1635-1636).

The son of notable preacher John Feild and father of Architect David Feild, he entered Emmanuel College, Cambridge as a sizar but received his B.A. from Pembroke College in 1595/6. He owed his earlier promotion to the Duke of Buckingham. The noted antiquary Sir John Stradling received his poetic endorsements for his works.

In 1598 he was briefly master of the school that is now Colchester Royal Grammar School.

References

External links

1575 births
1636 deaths
Bishops of Llandaff
Bishops of St Davids
Bishops of Hereford
17th-century Church of England bishops
Burials at Hereford Cathedral
Headmasters of Colchester Royal Grammar School
17th-century Welsh Anglican bishops